The 2019 International Swimming League was the inaugural edition of the International Swimming League, a professional swimming league, established in 2019. It comprised eight teams composed of both women and men. The league consisted of seven short course swimming meets which took place in seven cities around the world.

The budget for this first edition was $20 million.  The France-based team Energy Standard won the inaugural ISL title in the Final Match hosted at Mandalay Bay Resort and Casino in Las Vegas.

Schedule

The schedule consists of six regular-season meets, followed by a Final Match in Las Vegas. At each meet four of the eight teams compete (two from American conference and two from European conference). Two of the meets are 'derby' meet, one for all four American teams and one for all four European teams.

Events schedule
A total of 37 races were held in each match (the 4x50m mixed medley relay acted as a tie breaker).

International Swimming League
International Swimming League
International Swimming League
International Swimming League
International Swimming League
International Swimming League